Infrared Roses is a live compilation album by the Grateful Dead. It is a conglomeration of their famous improvisational segments "Drums" and "Space".

Somewhere in the middle of the second set of a Grateful Dead concert came a period of musical improvisation, usually 5 to 15 minutes, sometimes longer. This part of the concert is commonly referred to as "Space," and came right after a drum solo or duet. Infrared Roses is a compilation of these performances. There are no recognizable songs from the band's repertoire on this release (although a theme from "Uncle John's Band" appears at the start of "Riverside Rhapsody," "Infrared Roses" finishes with the band starting to play "I Need a Miracle," and "Magnesium Night Light" includes a quote of the opening theme of "Dark Star"). Robert Hunter, lyricist with the Grateful Dead, created the names of the tracks for the album.  The album cover is by Jerry Garcia, who at the time was creating digital art.

Music from Infrared Roses was used as the soundtrack for the 18-minute Grateful Dead video Infrared Sightings.

Track listing
Musicians listed in order of appearance on each track.
 "Crowd Sculpture" (Bralove) – 2:21
 Deadheads
 "Parallelogram" (Hart, Kreutzmann) – 5:06
 Bill Kreutzmann - Trap Drums Left, Mickey Hart - Trap Drums Right
 Mickey Hart - Beast (Large Drums) and Beam
 Bill Kreutzmann - Timbales
 "Little Nemo in Nightland" (Bralove, Garcia, Lesh, Weir) – 6:16
 Bob Weir - Guitar
 Jerry Garcia - Guitar
 Phil Lesh - Bass
 "Riverside Rhapsody" (Garcia, Hart, Kreutzmann, Lesh, Mydland, Weir) – 3:55
 Jerry Garcia - Guitar
 Bob Weir - Guitar
 Phil Lesh - Bass
 Brent Mydland - Keyboards
 Bill Kreutzmann - Drums
 Mickey Hart - Drums and Electronic Percussion
 "Post-Modern Highrise Table Top Stomp" (Garcia, Green, Hart, Kreutzmann, Lesh, Mydland, Weir) – 4:23
 Stereo Left ←  Stereo Center ↓  Stereo Right→
 Willie Green III - Kick Snare Hat ↓ 
 Bill Kreutzmann - Roto Toms ← 
 Mickey Hart - Talking Drums →
 Jerry Garcia - Electronic Percussion (Cow Bells, Shakers, Drums) ↓,→
 Bob Weir - Midi Guitar: Marimba ←,↓
 Phil Lesh - Bass ↓
 Brent Mydland - Midi Keyboard (Rattles, Shakers, Toms) ↓
 "Infrared Roses" (Bralove, Garcia, Lesh, Mydland, Weir) – 5:36
 Brent Mydland - Keys and Synth ("Outerspace FX", Voices, Piano)
 Phil Lesh - Bass and Synth (Trombone, FilterSweeps, French horn, Strings, Bells)
 Bob Weir - Guitar and Synths (Bells, Glockenspiel, Vibes)
 Jerry Garcia - Guitar and Synths (Trumpet, Mandolin, Voices, Strings)
 "Silver Apples of the Moon" (Hornsby, Welnick) – 5:41
 Bruce Hornsby - Piano and Synths (Strings, Vibes)
 Vince Welnick - Synths (Voices, Strings, Rattles, Organ, Bells)
 "Speaking in Swords" (Bralove, Hart, Kreutzmann)  – 3:29
 Mickey Hart - Beam and Electronic Percussion
 Bill Kreutzmann - Electronic Percussion
 "Magnesium Night Light" (Garcia, Lesh, Mydland, Weir)  – 5:28
 Jerry Garcia - Guitars and Synths (Trumpet, Strings)
 Bob Weir - Guitar and Synths  (Bells, Marimbas, Vibes)
 Phil Lesh - Bass and Synths (Bass Fuzz, Filter Sweep, Bells)
 Brent Mydland  - Keys and Synths (FX, Piano, Electric Piano)
 "Sparrow Hawk Row" (Bralove, Garcia, Healy, Hart, Kreutzmann, Lesh, Mydland, Weir) – 3:23
 Dan Healy - Processing and in no particular order
 Jerry Garcia - Guitar
 Bob Weir - Guitar
 Phil Lesh - Bass
 Brent Mydland - Keys
 Mickey Hart & Bill Kreutzmann - Drums
 "River of Nine Sorrows" (Bralove, Hart, Kreutzmann) – 4:25
 Mickey Hart - Electronic Percussion, Synths (Bird Whistles, Woodblocks, Log Drum)
 Bill Kreutzmann - Drums, Electronic Percussion, Synths (Gongs, Congas, Woodblocks, Electronic Toms)
 Bob Bralove - Drum Machine Sequencing
 "Apollo at the Ritz" (Garcia, Hart, Kreutzmann, Lesh, Marsalis, Mydland, Weir) – 8:15
 Jerry Garcia - Guitar and Synths (Church Bell, Flute, Double Reed and lots more)
 Phil Lesh - Bass and Synths (Bass Flute)
 Branford Marsalis - Tenor and Soprano Sax
 Bob Weir - Guitar and Synths (Trumpet Section)
 Brent Mydland - Keys
 Mickey Hart & Bill Kreutzmann - Drums

Personnel
Grateful Dead
 Jerry Garcia – drums, guitar, synthesizer
 Bob Weir – guitar, marimba, synthesizer
 Phil Lesh – bass guitar, synthesizer
 Brent Mydland – keyboards, rattles, synthesizer, tom-tom
 Vince Welnick – synthesizer
 Bruce Hornsby – piano, keyboards
 Bill Kreutzmann – drums
 Mickey Hart – drums
Additional musicians
 Deadheads on "Crowd Sculpture"
 Willie Green III – kick, snare, hat on "Post-Modern Highrise Table Top Stomp"
 Dan Healy – processing on "Sparrow Hawk Row"
 Bob Bralove – drum machine on "River of Nine Sorrows"
 Branford Marsalis – saxophone on "Apollo At The Ritz"
Production
Produced by Bob Bralove
Mixing engineer: Jeffrey Norman
Multi-track recording engineer: John Cutler
2-track recording: Dan Healy, Bob Bralove
Digital mastering: Joe Gastwirt
Synthesizer programming: Bob Bralove
Cover art: Jerry Garcia
Art direction: Amy F.

Recording dates
Although the editing techniques used for this album make it nearly impossible to identify all of the concerts used, some dates are identifiable. Some tracks may include material from other concerts in addition to those listed.

 "Parallelogram" recorded at JFK Stadium on July 7, 1989
 "Riverside Rhapsody" recorded at Giants Stadium on July 10, 1989
 "Post-Modern Highrise Table Top Stomp" recorded at Oakland Coliseum on December 28, 1989
 "Infrared Roses" recorded at Nassau Coliseum on March 30, 1990 (complete show later released on Spring 1990)
 "Magnesium Night Light" recorded at Hampton Coliseum on October 9, 1989 (complete show later released on Formerly the Warlocks. Also used for the video Backstage Pass)
 "River of Nine Sorrows" and "Apollo at the Ritz" recorded at Nassau Coliseum on March 29, 1990 (complete show later released on Wake Up to Find Out)

References

Grateful Dead compilation albums
Grateful Dead live albums
1991 live albums
1991 compilation albums
Grateful Dead Records live albums
Live experimental rock albums
Film soundtracks
1991 soundtrack albums
Experimental rock compilation albums
Experimental rock soundtracks
Grateful Dead Records soundtracks